Luthy or Lüthy is a surname. Notable people with the surname include:

Herbert Lüthy (1918–2002), Swiss historian and journalist
Jacques Lüthy (born 1959), Swiss former alpine skier
John D. Luthy, American firearms and self-defense instructor
Justin Luthy (born 1991), American soccer player
Oskar Lüthy (1882–1945), Swiss painter